is a city located in Fukushima Prefecture, Japan. , the city had an estimated population of 59,393 in 23,546 households  and a population density of 190 persons per km2.

Geography
Shirakawa is located in south-central Fukushima prefecture facing the Nasu plateau, and extending to the lowland Shirakawa Basin. 
Rivers: Abukuma River

Neighboring municipalities
 Fukushima Prefecture
 Nishigō
 Izumizaki
 Nakajima
 Yabuki
 Tanagura
 Ishikawa 
 Asakawa
 Ten'ei
Tochigi Prefecture
 Nasu

Climate
Shirakawa has a humid continental climate (Köppen Cfa) characterized by mild summers and cold winters.  The average annual temperature in Shirakawa is 11.4 °C. The average annual rainfall is 1377 mm with September as the wettest month. The temperatures are highest on average in August, at around 25.0 °C, and lowest in January, at around 0.3 °C.

Demographics
Per Japanese census data, the population of Shirakawa peaked around the year 2000 and has declined since.

History

The area of present-day Shirakawa was part of ancient Mutsu Province and was the location of a barrier gate on the Ōshū Kaidō connecting the capital at Kyoto with the northern provinces. In the Heian period, the Buddhist monk and waka poet Nōin composed the following poem about the region:

In the Edo period the area prospered as a castle town Shirakawa Domain, and was the site of a major battle in the Boshin War during the Meiji restoration. In the Meiji period, it was organized as part of Nakadōri region of Iwaki Province.

The town of Shirakawa was formed on April 1, 1889 with the creation of the modern municipalities system. On April 1, 1949, Shirakawa was elevated to city status after merging with the neighboring village of Ōnuma. Subsequent mergers occurred in 1954 and 1955 with the inclusion of the villages of Shirasaka, Odagawa, Goka and a portion of Omotegō into the territory of Shirakawa.

Government
Shirakawa has a mayor-council form of government with a directly elected mayor and a unicameral city legislature of 26 members. Shirakawa, together with Nishishirakawa District contributes three members to the Fukushima Prefectural Assembly. In terms of national politics, the city is part of Fukushima 3rd district of the lower house of the Diet of Japan.

Economy
Shirakawa has a mixed economy, and is a major commercial center for the surrounding region. Principal industries include electrical appliances, construction materials and clothing. The D+M Group has a plant where Marantz and Denon high fidelity components are produced.

Education
Shirakawa has fifteen public elementary schools and eight junior high schools operated by the city government and four public high schools operated by the Fukushima Prefectural Board of Education.

Post offices
Shirakawa has nineteen post offices within the boundaries of the city.

Transportation

Railway
JR East -  Tōhoku Main Line
  – (Shin-Shirakawa) –  -

Highway
  – Shirakawa-chūō Interchange – Abukuma Parking Area

Local attractions
Site of Shirakawa Barrier - National Historic Site 
Komine Castle – One of the 100 Castles of Japan
Nanko Park – National Historic Site and National Scenic Site 
Shirakawa Funada-Motonuma Sites – kofun period burial tumulus, National Historic Site
Yūki-Shirakawa Castle, National Historic Site 
Festivals held in Shirakawa include "Daruma Ichi", celebrating the traditional Daruma doll, wherein the city streets are packed with stalls selling Daruma, a variety of festival foods and charms, and "Chōchin Matsuri" (Lantern Festival), which is held each summer, with a special three-day celebration held once every three years.

International relations
  Compiègne, France, since October 20, 1988
  Anoka, Minnesota, USA, since October 13, 2002

Noted people from Shirakawa
Gishu Nakayama, writer
Atsushi Fujita, Olympic marathon runner
Hideo Madarame, Olympic cyclist
Toshiaki Fushimi, Olympic cyclist

References

External links

 

 
Cities in Fukushima Prefecture